The Capricorns were an  indietronica band consisting of Heather Lynn and Kirsten Nordine, both of whom sing and play keyboards, with Lynn also playing tambourine. They formed their band in the spring of 2000, playing on vintage Casio keyboards purchased at garage sales.  They write pop songs which one of their labels described as combining "infectious hooks with 'dear diary' lyrics".  They are originally from Grayslake, Illinois.

Band history
On the band's website, Lynn commented on their start and early success:
When we started making music, it was just for fun. We knew that Kirsten would be moving away in a few months and i would be focused on my writing. We didn't anticipate that people would be so into our music or that we would ever end up putting out records. It's really rad that people like us so much, but because we didn't start a band to become famous or to get signed or whatever we aren't necessarily motivated by the same things that other bands are.

Nordine and Lynn traveled to Cincinnati, Ohio to record their first album, The Capricorns Are Gonna Get You, a now-out of print cassette released on their own label.  Jason Barnett, of Paroxysm Records, heard the record, and offered them a record contract.

Their second album, In the Zone, was described by Kotori magazine as "All casio all the time (with occasional tambourine), they've got hooks so sweet you can't help but get addicted". and by Allmusic as "the perfect soundtrack for when the Powerpuff Girls become the Powerpuff Late Teenagers, mixing in a touch more angst but still gleefully kicking ass and taking names."

The duo's last album, Pure Magical Love, was released in January 2006, and according to Jessie Nelson of the Athens Exchange, "oozes quintessential girliness", going on to describe it as "girl music for women who remember being ten, dressing up in old clothes and dancing around the living room to Madonna". In spring of 2008, Heather Lynn created a live performance of the Pure Magical Love record that she performed at Version Festival in Chicago, which evolved into a band called Pure Magical Love.

Discography

The Capricorns Are Gonna Get You, circa 2000, out of print

In The Zone, 2001, Paroxysm Records
The New Sound
Nintendo Song
Geeky Pop Song
Remote Control
In The Closet
The Longest Drive
Stay Awake
Nathan II
Song For 18
The Back Room
Teenage Boyfriend
Pretty Girls
In The Zone

Go The Distance, July 2003, Banazan Records
Sunset Over Malibu
Beatbox
'Mickey Baby
You'll Never Be Mine
Recyclone
Slow 80's Song
Prisoners of Love
Yeah, So?
Everywhere I Go
New York Is Burning
Pure Magical Love, January 2006, Paroxysm Records
Pure Magical Love
Vega City
The Sailor
Don't Close Your Eyes
Runaway
Call Me Down
Rilya
Ghosts
End of the World Love Song

References

External links

All-female bands
Musical groups from Illinois